Victor Osuagwu  is a Nigerian actor who won the  City People Movie Special Recognition Award at the City People Entertainment Awards and Is a former president of the Lagos State chapter of the Actors Guild of Nigeria.

Early life and education
Osuagwu is from Mbaise Local Government Area of Imo State in the south eastern geographical location of Nigeria. Osuagwu grew up in Surulere, Lagos State in south western part of Nigeria. Osuagwu completed both his primary and secondary school education in Nigeria where he obtained both his First School Leaving Certificate and WAEC certificate.

Career
Osuagwu officially became recognized as a Nigerian actor in 1997. Osuagwu debuted into the Nigerian movie industry Nollywood with the second part of a movie titled Evil Passion 2 whilst an undergraduate in the university.

Endorsement
Osuagwu In 2015 became an ambassador for Nigerian multinational telecommunications company GLO.

Awards
Osuagwu won the City People Movie Special Recognition Award at the City People Entertainment Awards.

Personal life
Osuagwu is married to Roseline Nchelem, whom he met in 1990 and married in 2002. Osuagwu is also a Nigerian chief & bares the title of Ochibundu 1 of Udo Ancient Kingdom in Ezinihitte Mbaise LGA of Imo State.

Selected filmography
Keke Soldiers
Professional Beggars
My Classmate
Corporate Beggar
Evil Passion 
Evil Passion 2
One Dollar (with Patience Ozokwor)
Adam Goes to School
He Goat
Ofeke
My Only Love
Lion Finger
Our Daily Bread
Onye Amuma (with Nkem Owoh) 
The Chronicles (with Onyeka Onwenu & Segun Arinze) 
Bird Flu
Powerful Civilian
Anti-Crime
Chelsea/Liverpool
Men On The Run
My Kingdom Come
Store Keeper
Tears From Holland
Joshua
Trouble Makers
My Only Love
No Shaking (with Chiwetalu Agu and Sam Loco Efe)
Nwa Teacher
Slow Poison
Onye-Eze 
Agaba.

References

External links
 Victor Osuagwu on IMDb

Living people
Igbo male actors
University of Port Harcourt alumni
Year of birth missing (living people)
Nigerian male television actors
People from Mbaise
People from Imo State
Male actors from Imo State